Alpenus whalleyi is a moth of the family Erebidae. It was described by Watson in 1989. It is found in south-western Africa.

References

Moths described in 1989
Spilosomina
Insects of Namibia
Moths of Africa